Henri Houben (1858–1931, born and died in Antwerp) was a Belgian genre painter.

Life
He originally studied to be a violinist, but his interest in painting took the upper hand, so he enrolled at the Royal Academy of Fine Arts (Antwerp), where he studied under Charles Verlat. He later assisted Verlat with his panoramic paintings ("March of the Russian Army" and "The Battle of Waterloo") and executed decorative paintings from designs by Albrecht De Vriendt in the Antwerp City Hall. In 1885, he became a Professor at the Academy.

In Belgium, he worked primarily in Antwerp and the Kempen. He also travelled in Italy and Spain, but developed a particular fondness for the Netherlands, especially the maritime areas and Zeeland, working in Katwijk, Middelburg, Volendam, Veere, Vlissingen, Sluis and Yerseke. In Volendam he was a regular guest at the Hotel Spaander, a favorite spot for many painters, including Renoir.

His preferred subjects were the picturesque villagers who, at that time, still often dressed in native costume. He also produced five etchings for "Les Pittoresques", a book of sonnets by Georges Eekhoud.

Further reading
Le dictionnaire des peintres belges du XIVe siècle à nos jours, Brussels, 1994.
Schilderdorpen in de Kempen. De Molse School (exhibition catalog), Eindhoven (Museum Kempenland), 2007.
Dick Brinkkemper et al., Volendam. Schildersdorp 1880-1940, photographs by Jan Tuijp. Zwolle, Waanders (2006)

External links

 Internet Archive: Les Pittoresques by Eekhoud, with illustrations by Houben.
 ArtNet: More paintings by Houben

1858 births
1931 deaths
Genre painters
19th-century Belgian painters
19th-century Belgian male artists
20th-century Belgian painters
20th-century Belgian male artists